Theo Pahlplatz (born 3 April 1947 in Oldenzaal) is a Dutch retired footballer. He spent most of his career with FC Twente after a spell with hometown club Quick'20. He is part of the team that won the KNVB Cup in the 1976-77 season, and also played European football in the UEFA Cup.

References 

1947 births
Living people
Dutch footballers
FC Twente players
Netherlands international footballers
People from Oldenzaal
Association football forwards
Footballers from Overijssel